Retovje Springs is a group of springs that join to form the Big Ljubljanica River.

Name
The name Retovje and names like it (e.g., Retje, Dolnje Retje) are derived from the Slovene common noun retje 'powerful karst spring' from the root *vrětje 'springing, gushing'. The generic term okence in the Slovene name of two springs at the site is a diminutive of the common noun okno (literally, 'window') in the secondary meaning 'spring, place where groundwater surfaces'.

Geography

The springs are located in the Retovje Valley, a steephead valley near Verd south of Vrhnika. The springs include:
 Walnut Spring
 Cliff Spring
 Big Spring
 Little Spring
Big Spring and Little Spring are the two most powerful springs in the group. After almost 1 km, the Big Ljubljanica joins the Little Ljubljanica to form the Ljubljanica River.

Exploration
The karst springs and sumps at Retovje were first studied in 1939 by the Kuščer brothers. Big Spring has been explored to a length of 270 m and a depth of 25 m, and Little Spring to a length of 305 m and depth of 45 m.

References

External links
Retovje Springs on Geopedia

Municipality of Vrhnika
Springs of Slovenia
Karst springs
SRetovje